Timothy Paul Redwine is an American television actor.

His first TV appearance was in 1995 as "Justin" in Two Bits and Pepper. He had the starring roles in the film P.U.N.K.S. (1999) and co-starring roles in films like Family Secrets (2001) and The Thirteenth Year (1999). Most recently he has appeared in CSI, Step by Step, and Prey. He has had over a dozen TV roles, ranging from minor guest appearances to a starring role.

Not appearing in any major projects since 2001, Redwine left the Hollywood atmosphere and now quietly resides in Northern California. He is now a devout Christian.

He was born Donato Alleva. Prior to entering in the entertainment industry, his mother had his name changed to Timothy Paul Redwine. For most of his career, he used Tim Redwine as his stage name.

Filmography 
Film

Television

References

External links

Date of birth missing (living people)
Living people
American male film actors
American male television actors
Year of birth missing (living people)